Gymnastics at the 2007 Southeast Asian Games was divided into three sub-categories: artistic gymnastics, rhythmic gymnastics, and aerobics. All events were held at the Gymnasium 1 at the His Majesty the King's Birthday 80th Anniversary Stadium (5 December 2007), Nakhon Ratchasima Province, Thailand.

Medal winners

Artistic

Men

Women

Rhythmic

Women

Aerobic

External links
Southeast Asian Games Official Results

2007 Southeast Asian Games events
2007
Southeast Asian Games
Southeast Asian Games,2007